

Ancient Times

Carthaginian Empire

264 B.C.E. — 146 B.C.E. Punic Wars

Kingdom of Numidia
112 B.C.E. — 106 B.C.E. Jugurthine War

Roman Province of Mauretania Tingitana
420s C.E. Vandals conquer the Roman province

Medieval Times

Vandal Kingdom
June 533 C.E. — March 534 C.E. Vandalic War

Byzantine Africa
534 C.E. — 577 C.E. The Moorish Wars
534 C.E. First Moorish uprising
536 C.E. Military mutiny
544 C.E. Second Moorish uprising and the revolt of Guntharic
577 C.E. Conflict with Moorish kingdom of Garmul

Byzantine Exarchate of Africa
647 C.E. — 709 C.E. Muslim conquest of the Maghreb

Umayyad dynasty

680 C.E. — 692 C.E. Second Fitna
739 C.E. — 743 C.E. Berber Revolt
circa 740 C.E. Battle of the Nobles
circa October 741 C.E. Battle of Bagdoura
744 C.E. — 746 C.E. Third Fitna

Fatimid dynasty
1020 C.E. Fatimid Civil War

Almoravid dynasty
1053 C.E. — 1080 C.E. Almoravid conquest of Northern Africa

Almohad dynasty
1160 C.E. All of Ifriqiya conquered and annexed by the Almohads

Modern Times

Marinid dynasty
1415 C.E. — 1578 C.E. Moroccan—Portuguese conflict
August 22, 1415 C.E. Conquest of Ceuta
August 1419 C.E. Siege of Ceuta
September 13, 1437 C.E. — October 19, 1437 C.E. Battle of Tangier
August 24, 1471 C.E. Conquest of Asilah
August 28, 1513 C.E. — August 29, 1513 C.E. Battle of Azemmour
March 1541 C.E. — September 1541 C.E. Fall of Agadir
August 4, 1578 C.E. Battle of Alcácer Quibir
1465 C.E. Moroccan Revolt

Wattasid dynasty
1492 C.E. — 1898 C.E. Spanish colonial campaigns
1278 C.E. — 1958 C.E. Hispano-Moroccan wars
September 1497 C.E. Conquest of Melilla

Saadi dynasty
1603 C.E. — 1627 C.E. War of the Saadi Dynasty Succession
September 1627 C.E. Civil War During the Reign of Zidan al-Nasir
1492 C.E. — 1898 C.E. Spanish colonial campaigns
1278 C.E. — 1958 C.E. Hispano-Moroccan wars
1689 C.E. Siege of Larache

Alaouite dynasty
1492 C.E. — 1898 C.E. Spanish colonial campaigns
1278 C.E. — 1958 C.E. Hispano-Moroccan wars
December 9, 1774 C.E. — March 19, 1775 C.E. Siege of Melilla
1844 C.E. First Franco—Moroccan War
August 6, 1844 C.E. Bombardment of Tangiers
August 14, 1844 C.E. Battle of Isly
August 15, 1844 C.E. — August 17, 1844 C.E. Bombardment of Mogador
October 22, 1859 C.E. — April 26, 1860 C.E. Spanish—Moroccan War
1860 C.E. Battle of Tétouan
1492 C.E. — 1898 C.E. Spanish colonial campaigns
1278 C.E. — 1958 C.E. Hispano-Moroccan wars
1893 C.E. Rif War
1909 C.E. Rif War

French protectorate in Morocco
1911 C.E. — 1912 C.E. French conquest of Morocco
September 6, 1912 C.E. Battle of Sidi Bou Othman
July 28, 1914 C.E. — November 11, 1918 C.E. World War I
July 28, 1914 C.E. — November 11, 1918 C.E. North Africa during World War I
1914 C.E. — 1921 C.E. Zaian War
1492 C.E. — 1898 C.E. Spanish colonial campaigns
1278 C.E. — 1958 C.E. Hispano-Moroccan wars
1920 C.E. — 1926 C.E. Rif War
1957 C.E. — 1958 C.E. Ifni War
September 1, 1939 C.E. — September 2, 1945 C.E. World War II
June 10, 1940 C.E. — May 2, 1945 C.E. Mediterranean and Middle East theatre of World War II
June 10, 1940 C.E. — May 13, 1943 C.E. North African Campaign
November 8, 1942 C.E. — November 16, 1942 C.E. Operation Torch
November 8, 1942 C.E. — November 16, 1942 C.E. Naval Battle of Casablanca
November 8, 1942 C.E. Battle of Port Lyautey
July 17, 1936 C.E. — April 1, 1939 C.E. Spanish Civil War
July 17, 1936 C.E. — July 18, 1936 C.E. Military uprising in Melilla

Kingdom of Morocco
1963 C.E. Sand War
1970 C.E. — ongoing Western Sahara conflict
June 17, 1970 C.E. Zemla Intifada
1975 C.E. — 1991 C.E. Western Sahara War
Engagements
December 10, 1975 C.E. — December 22, 1975 C.E. Battles of La Güera and Tichla
January 27, 1976 C.E. — January 29, 1976 C.E. First Battle of Amgala
December 1977 C.E. — July 1978 C.E. Opération Lamantin
November 18, 1987 C.E. Battles of Farsia and Oum Dreyga
October 7, 1989 C.E. Battle of Guelta Zemmour
October 10, 1989 C.E. — October 11, 1989 C.E. Battle of Hausa
November 8, 1989 C.E. Battle of Amgala
August 4, 1991 C.E. — September 6, 1991 C.E. Tifariti offensive
International incidents
February 24, 1985 C.E. AWI Polar 3
1999 C.E. — 2004 C.E. First Sahrawi Intifada
May 2005 C.E. — November 2005 C.E. Independence Intifada (Western Sahara)
October 9, 2010 C.E. — November 8, 2010 C.E. Gdeim Izik protest camp
February 25, 2011 C.E. — May 2011 C.E. Western Saharan protests
July 18, 2002 C.E. Perejil Island crisis

Notes

References

See also
Royal Moroccan Armed Forces
Royal Moroccan Army
Royal Moroccan Navy
Royal Moroccan Air Force
Military history of Africa
African military systems to 1800 C.E.
African military systems 1800 C.E. — 1900 C.E.
African military systems after 1900 C.E.

Military history of Morocco
Conflicts